24 Parganas district (cabbiś pargaṇā jēlā) is a former district of the Indian state of West Bengal. The district was split into two districts — North 24 Parganas district and South 24 Parganas district, with effect from 1 March 1980.

Etymology 
The name is derived from the number of parganas or divisions contained in the Zamindari of Calcutta which was ceded to the East India Company by Mir Jafar in 1757.

History
Not much is known about the districts history before the fifteenth century. References to this portion of the Gangetic delta in the Puranas, Mahabharata and Raghuvamsa show that it lay between the kingdom of the Suhmas and the Vangas.

Cessation of land 
On 20 December 1757, the then new Nawab of Bengal, Mir Zafar assigned the East India Company zamindari rights over the Zamindari of Calcutta. In 1759, Robert Clive received as a jagir the Zamindari of Calcutta as a result of services rendered in quelling rebellion of the Nawab's eldest son, Shah Alam. In 1765, another grant which received the Nawab's approval gave unconditional proprietary rights of the 24 Parganas for 10 years following which it the proprietary rights would go to the East India Company.

See also
Pargana

References

Former districts of West Bengal